Pseudancistrus asurini is a species of catfish in the family Loricariidae. It is native to South America, where it occurs in the Xingu River basin in the state of Pará in Brazil. The species reaches 19.6 cm (7.7 inches) SL. Its specific epithet, asurini, refers to the Asurini people, native speakers of the Xingu Asurini language, who inhabit the Xingu basin near Altamira. It was described in 2015 by Gabriel S. C. Silva, Fábio F. Roxo, and Claudio Oliveira alongside the related species Pseudancistrus kayabi from the Tapajós basin.

P. asurini appears in the aquarium trade, where it is often referred to either as the yellow-seam pleco or by its associated L-number, which is L-067.

References 

Siluriformes
Fish described in 2015